The 2021 Penn State Nittany Lions women's soccer team will represent Pennsylvania State University during the 2021 NCAA Division I women's soccer season and the 2021 Big Ten Conference women's soccer season. It was the program's 28th season fielding a women's varsity soccer team, and their 28th season in the Big Ten Conference. The 2021 season is Erica Dambach's 15th year at the helm.

Background 
The 2021 season is the Nittany Lions' 28th season as a varsity soccer program, and their 28th season playing in the Big Ten Conference. The team is led by 15th year head coach, Erica Dambach, who had previously served as a head coach for the Harvard. Tim Wassell was promoted to associate head coach in July 2021.

Penn State was invited to compete in the 2021 NCAA tournament as an unranked seed.

Player movement

Squad

Roster

Personnel 
{|class="wikitable"
|-
! style="" scope="col" colspan="2"|Front office
|-

|-
! style="" scope="col" colspan="2"|Coaching staff
|-

Schedule 

|-
!colspan=8 style=""| 
Pre-season
|-

|-
!colspan=8 style=""| Regular season
|-

|-
!colspan=8 style=""| Big Ten Tournament
|-

|-
!colspan=8 style=""| NCAA Tournament
|-

Source:Penn State Athletics

Rankings

Preseason Big Ten poll
Penn State was predicted to finish 1st in the Big Ten Conference.

Season rankings

References

External links 

 PSU Soccer Schedule

Penn State Nittany Lions
Penn State Nittany Lions women's soccer
Penn State Nittany Lions
Penn State